Thomas Philips Strong (1890 – 15 July 1917) was an English professional football left back and left half who played in the Football League for Lincoln City.

Personal life 
Strong served as a private in the South Staffordshire Regiment during the First World War and died of wounds sustained in West Flanders on 15 July 1917. He was buried in Croisilles Railway Cemetery.

Career statistics

References

1890 births
1917 deaths
Footballers from Newcastle upon Tyne
English footballers
English Football League players
Association football fullbacks
British Army personnel of World War I
South Staffordshire Regiment soldiers
British military personnel killed in World War I
Lincoln City F.C. players
Military personnel from Newcastle upon Tyne